Lajos Terjék (born 29 October 1980) is a former Hungarian football player.

References 
EUFO
UEFA
HLSZ

1980 births
Living people
Hungarian footballers
Hungary under-21 international footballers
Hungarian expatriate footballers
Cypriot First Division players
Cypriot Second Division players
Újpest FC players
Fehérvár FC players
Nyíregyháza Spartacus FC players
Enosis Neon Paralimni FC players
Anagennisi Deryneia FC players
Ayia Napa FC players
Ermis Aradippou FC players
Othellos Athienou F.C. players
Expatriate footballers in Israel
Hungarian expatriate sportspeople in Israel
Expatriate footballers in Cyprus
Hungarian expatriate sportspeople in Cyprus
Association football forwards
Footballers from Budapest